Heptagenia flavescens is a species of flatheaded mayfly in the family Heptageniidae. It is found in Central America and North America.

References

Mayflies
Articles created by Qbugbot
Insects described in 1862